Sir Thomas Sherlock Gooch, 5th Baronet (2 November 1767 – 18 December 1851) was a British politician and landowner. 

He was the son of Sir Thomas Gooch, 4th Baronet and Anna Maria Hayward. He was elected as the Member of Parliament for Suffolk in 1806 and held the seat until 1830. In 1833 he served as the High Sheriff of Suffolk in 1833. 

Gooch married Marianne Whittaker, the daughter of Abraham Whittaker, on 12 May 1796. Together they had six children.

References

1767 births
1851 deaths
Baronets in the Baronetage of Great Britain
High Sheriffs of Suffolk
Members of the Parliament of the United Kingdom for English constituencies
UK MPs 1806–1807
UK MPs 1807–1812
UK MPs 1812–1818
UK MPs 1818–1820
UK MPs 1820–1826
UK MPs 1826–1830